Shah Faisal Town, lies in the eastern part of the city that took its name from Shah Faisal Colony.

History 
Shah Faisal Town was formed in 2001 as part of The Local Government Ordinance 2001, and was subdivided into 11 union councils. The town system was disbanded in 2011, and Shah Faisal Town was re-organized as part of Karachi East District, before being amalgamated into the new Korangi District.

The federal government introduced local government reforms in the year 2000, which eliminated the previous "third tier of government" (administrative divisions) and replaced it with the fourth tier (districts). The effect in Karachi was the dissolution of the former Karachi Division in 2001, and the merging of its five districts to form a new Karachi City-District with eighteen autonomous constituent towns including Shah Faisal Town. In 2011, the system was disbanded but remained in place for bureaucratic administration until 2015, when the Karachi Metropolitan Corporation system was reintroduced. In 2015, Shah Faisal Town was re-organized as part of Karachi East district, before being amalgamated into the new Korangi District.

Location 
The town was bordered by Malir Town to the northeast, Bin Qasim Town to the east, Korangi Town and Landhi Town to the south, and Faisal Cantonment and Malir Cantonment to the west and northwest. The Malir River formed  the southern boundary of the town and the Shahrah-e-Faisal highway formed much of the northern boundary with the Jinnah International Airport at the northern end of the town.

Neighbourhoods 
Shah Faisal Town had twenty-one densely populated neighborhoods:

Wireless Gate 
The Wireless Gate serves as a major entrance way to Shah Faisal Town. The name is derived from the abundance of telecommunication installations (PTA) and offices in the area.  The area hosted a radio station until the early 1980s. The name wireless gate was given to the railway crossing as the road end at the gate of the wireless station installation

See also 
 Karachi Local Government
 Shah Faisal Colony
Korangi District

References

External links 
 Shah Faisal Town website
 Karachi City Government
 Bright Scope College of Business & I.T.

 
2001 establishments in Pakistan
Korangi District
Towns in Karachi